Rudolph W. Archer (September 20, 1869 – January 14, 1932) was a Republican politician in the U.S. state of Ohio who was Ohio State Treasurer 1915-1917 and 1919–1923.

Biography

Rudolph W. Archer was born in Bellaire, Belmont County, Ohio in 1869. He dropped out of school at age ten to help support the family. He worked in a glass factory, and learned business. He was nominated for county treasurer twice by the Republican Party, and twice elected.

Archer was first elected State Treasurer of Ohio in 1914, and served a two-year term. In 1916, he was defeated by Democrat Chester E. Bryan. In 1918 and 1920, he was elected twice more for State Treasurer.

References

Ohio Republicans
State treasurers of Ohio
1869 births
People from Bellaire, Ohio
1932 deaths